I Never Said Goodbye is the ninth studio album by American singer Sammy Hagar, released on June 23, 1987, by Geffen Records. It was his first solo album since 1984's VOA and was released while he was a member of Van Halen. The album was recorded in ten days as a contractual obligation to Geffen Records as a condition of his leaving the label to join Van Halen and their record label, Warner Bros. Records (Geffen's distributor at the time, and also Hagar's label when he was with Montrose). The album spent 23 weeks on the Billboard 200 chart and became his highest charting solo album, peaking at number 14 on the chart on August 15, 1987.

The album was originally titled Sammy Hagar, and included an untitled cover. The album was renamed I Never Said Goodbye, the name being chosen as part of an MTV promotional contest. Some pressings retain the title Sammy Hagar, not to be confused with the 1977 album Sammy Hagar.

It features Eddie Van Halen on bass guitar, he also plays during a brief section of the guitar solo on "Eagles Fly".

The songs "Give to Live" and "Eagles Fly" were also performed live by Van Halen together with Hagar. "Give to Live" also topped the Mainstream Rock Tracks chart in 1987, a first for Hagar as a solo artist. The former song was included on the album Live: Right Here, Right Now, the latter on the optional bonus disk as well as on the "Jump" single.

"Boys' Night Out" was performed live on the American TV show Late Night with David Letterman.

Song information
"Returning Home" was intended to be a sequel to "Silver Lights" from Hagar's first album Nine on a Ten Scale. Whereas "Silver Lights" was a story about aliens taking humans from Earth, "Returning Home" tells the story of the humans' return trip. Hagar said that it could also apply to a tale that his future self might tell a child at that time.
"Standin' at the Same Old Crossroads" was released in an extended version on the "Give to Live" single.
"Privacy" was inspired by several run-ins that Hagar had with the California Highway Patrol while driving in his car with black-tinted windows. While a court challenge would always rule in Hagar's favor, the law could not prevent the police from repeatedly pulling him over and giving him tickets.
"Eagles Fly" was demoed with three other songs as a follow up to Hagar's VOA album before joining Van Halen. When they had almost finished recording 5150 and "Dreams" had not yet been written, 5150s producer, Mick Jones, suggested that the band needed another song. Hagar presented "Eagles Fly" to the band acoustically, which was rejected as being too folksy. The band later joined Hagar performing the song live on their 1995 Balance tour. The song's lyrics deal with the level of consciousness immediately after birth, where humans are aware of all that is and all that was.

Legacy
In 2012, for the album's 25th anniversary, radio show "In The Studio", interviewed Sammy.

Track listing

Personnel
Sammy Hagar – lead vocals, guitars
Eddie Van Halen – bass, backing vocals, guitar on "Eagles Fly"
Jesse Harms – keyboards, backing vocals
David Lauser – drums, backing vocals

Additional musicians
Albhy Galuten – additional keyboards and percussion
Omar Hakim – drum overdubs on tracks "Hands and Knees" & "Back into You"

Production
David Thoener – engineer, co-producer
Rob Beaton, Cary Butler, Robert DelaGarza, Marc DeSisto, Mark McKenna, Toby Wright – assistant engineers
Greg Fulginiti – mastering at Artisan Sound Recorders

Charts

Album

Singles

Certifications

References

External links
 Album liner notes and lyrics at Sammy Hagar's official web site

Sammy Hagar albums
1987 albums
Geffen Records albums
Glam metal albums